Build King (stylized as BUILD KING) is a Japanese manga series written and illustrated by Mitsutoshi Shimabukuro. It originated as a one-shot that was published in Shueisha's Weekly Shōnen Jump in April 2018, before becoming a full series that was serialized in the same magazine from November 2020 to April 2021. It has been compiled into three tankōbon volumes.

Publication
The series is written and illustrated by Mitsutoshi Shimabukuro. It originated as a one-shot that was published in Weekly Shōnen Jump on April 23, 2018. On November 8, 2020, it was announced the one-shot will become a full series. The full series was published in Weekly Shōnen Jump from November 16, 2020 to April 12, 2021. Three tankōbon volumes have been released from April 2 to September 3, 2021. The third and final volume included extra content that did not appear during its serialization.

Viz Media published the original one-shot in their digital magazine Weekly Shonen Jump. Viz Media, along with Manga Plus, also published chapters of the full series simultaneously with the Japanese release.

Volume list

References

External links
 Official website at Weekly Shōnen Jump 
 

Fantasy anime and manga
Shōnen manga
Shueisha manga
Viz Media manga